Parco District is one of thirty-four districts of the province Jauja in Peru.

Location
It is located at 3.435 meters, in an area covering 32.82 km2, exactly at kilometer 60 of the central road on the route from La Oroya to Huancayo in the Junín Region, Jauja Province.

See also 
 Waqlamarka

References